This is a ranking of languages by the number of sovereign countries in which they are de jure or de facto official.

List 

This is a ranking of languages by number of sovereign countries in which they are de jure or de facto official, although there are no precise inclusion criteria or definition of a language. An '*' (asterisk) indicates a country whose independence is disputed.

Partially recognized or de facto independent countries are denoted by an asterisk (*)

See also 
 Linguistic demography
 Lists of endangered languages
 Lists of languages
 List of largest languages without official status by total number of speakers
 List of countries by the number of recognized official languages
 List of languages by number of native speakers
 List of languages by total number of speakers
 Number of languages by country
 World language
 Languages used on the Internet

Footnotes

References

Official languages